Dean Earnest Philpott (born November 11, 1935), nicknamed the Anaheim Assassin,  is a former American football fullback who played one season with the Chicago Cardinals of the National Football League (NFL). He was drafted by the Cardinals in the eleventh round of the 1958 NFL Draft. He played college football at Fresno State University and attended Anaheim High School in Anaheim, California. Philpott was also a member of the Oakland Raiders of the American Football League (AFL).

Early years
Philpott started at Anaheim High School participating in Junior varsity football, basketball and diving. He then participated in varsity football, basketball and ran track from 1952 to 1953. He played varsity football, basketball and baseball his senior year in 1954. He earned  All Sunset League First-team honors as a halfback in football his junior year and as a fullback in his senior year. Philpottwas also named an All CIF First-team fullback his senior year while being voted Most Inspirational and Most Valuable Player in his junior varsity and varsity years.

College career
Philpott was a two-way starter for the Fresno State Bulldogs from 1954 to 1957 and was known as the Anaheim Assassin. He set school records for rushing yards with 2,579 and points scored during his college career. He rushed for 767 yards, scored 14 touchdowns and kicked 10 extra points his senior year. Philpott earned First-team All Conference honors for three consecutive years. He was also named to the California Collegiate Athletic Association First-team twice and to All Coast First-team for four consecutive years. He was inducted into the Fresno State University Athletic Hall of Fame in 1993.

Professional career
Philpott was selected by the Chicago Cardinals of the NFL with the 122nd pick in the 1958 NFL Draft and played in nine games for the team during the 1958 season. He took the 1959 season off while serving in the United States Army as an active duty reservist. He suffered a career ending injury while playing for the AFL's Oakland Raiders during a pre-season game in 1960.

Personal life
Philpott was later a high school teacher.

References

External links
Just Sports Stats

Living people
1935 births
20th-century educators
American football fullbacks
American Football League players
Schoolteachers from Arkansas
Chicago Cardinals players
Fresno State Bulldogs football players
Oakland Raiders players
People from Mena, Arkansas
Players of American football from Arkansas
United States Army reservists